Wrecked is a comedy reality series that aired on MTV UK in 2007, was hosted by Lee Dainton and Mathew Pritchard. In each episode, two rivals are challenged to complete a series of Dirty Sanchez-style stunts in order to crown a winner.

Episodes
There were 8 episodes in total.

Episode 1 - Norfolk, Gary v Andy
Episode 2 - Bedworth, Andy v Matt
Episode 3 - Loughborough, Ben v Dave
Episode 4 - Southend, James v Lee
Episode 5 - Bournemouth, Nick v Phil
Episode 6 - Cambridge, Martin v Dan
Episode 7 - Darlington, John v Chris
Episode 8 - Cardiff, Rhodri v Phil

2007 in British television
2007 British television series debuts
2007 British television series endings
British comedy television shows
MTV original programming